"Tessellate" is a song by English indie rock band alt-J from their debut studio album, An Awesome Wave (2012). The song was written by Joe Newman, Gus Unger-Hamilton, Gwilym Sainsbury and Thom Green and produced by Charlie Andrew. It was originally released on 13 October 2011 as a double A-side single with “Bloodflood”, before being released separately on 13 July 2012 as the album's third single.

Music video
A music video to accompany the release of "Tessellate" was first released on YouTube on 9 July 2012. The video was directed by Ben Newbury and is an artistic reworking of the famous painting The School of Athens by Raphael, using 21st century characters in a room similar to the painting's background (Panthéon, in Paris). To reinforce the connection, one of the characters at the very beginning of the clip is wearing a printed T-shirt of the painting.

Covers
In 2013, "Tessellate" was covered by English singer and songwriter Ellie Goulding on the deluxe edition of Halcyon Days, the reissue of her second studio album, Halcyon. English indie folk band Mumford & Sons also covered the song on BBC Radio 1's Live Lounge on 25 September 2012; their version was included on the compilation album BBC Radio 1's Live Lounge 2013.

Media usage
The song is used as the opening theme song to the anime series Ingress.

The song also features in Episode 5, Series 6 of Sons of Anarchy, and Episode 3, Season 1 of The Imperfects.

Track listing

Credits and personnel
Lead vocals – Alt-J (∆)
Producers – Charlie Andrew
Lyrics – Joe Newman, Gus Unger-Hamilton, Gwilym Sainsbury, Thom Green
Label: Infectious

Charts

Certifications

Release history

References

2012 singles
2012 songs
Alt-J songs
Ellie Goulding songs
Indietronica songs
Songs written by Thom Sonny Green